The Hong Kong Cricket Club is situated in the heart of Hong Kong Island surrounded by the hills and greenery of Wong Nai Chung Gap.

History 

At a public meeting held in Hong Kong in June 1851, a proposal that a club with a turfed playing field be built on the military parade ground south of the waterfront led to the launch of one of the first cricket clubs outside England.

In 1975, the Club gave up its site in the middle of the bustling Central District and moved to the greener Wong Nai Chung Gap.

See also
 Cricket in Hong Kong

References 

Hong Kong rugby union teams
Cricket clubs established in 1851
Cricket grounds in Hong Kong
Multi-sport clubs in China
Chinese club cricket teams
1851 establishments in Hong Kong
Cricket teams in Hong Kong